Robert M. Blakeman (August 9, 1925 – April 21, 2018) was an American attorney and politician who served in the New York State Assembly from 1961 to 1964 and in 1966.

Blakeman was born in Manhattan to parents Jesse H. and Edythe R. Blakeman. He was a graduate of Long Beach High School where he played baseball and was a band member. At the age of 17, Blakeman enlisted in the United States Merchant Marine in World War II. During his four year service he was an officer assigned to gasoline tankers and travelled the world supplying war efforts with needed supplies. After the war, he received an Honorable Discharge and returned to Long Island where he enrolled in Hofstra University and afterwards New York University Law School where he graduated with the degree of Juris Doctor. He was later admitted to the New York Bar and started a career that spanned over 65 years as a sole practitioner in a Valley Stream, New York office.

Blakeman was married to his wife Betty Ellen Blakeman for more than 40 years before her passing in 1995.

He died on April 21, 2018, in Valley Stream, New York at age 92.

References

1925 births
2018 deaths
Republican Party members of the New York State Assembly
Politicians from New York City